Exhibition Road is a street in South Kensington, London which is home to several major museums and academic establishments, including the Victoria and Albert Museum, the Science Museum and the Natural History Museum.

Overview 
The road gets its name from The Great Exhibition of 1851 which was held just inside Hyde Park at the northern end of the road. After the central road in the area, Queen's Gate, it is the second thoroughfare in what was once Albertopolis.

It provides access to many nationally significant institutions, including:
 Victoria and Albert Museum
 Science Museum
 Natural History Museum (which incorporates the former Geological Museum)
 Royal Geographical Society, at the north end in Kensington Gore
 Polish Institute and Sikorski Museum, at the north end in Princes Gate
 Imperial College London (directly and via Imperial College Road) 
 Pepperdine University Abroad
 Jagiellonian University London Study Centre in the Polish Hearth Club 
 London Goethe Institute 
 The Hyde Park Chapel of the Church of Jesus Christ of Latter-day Saints

Shared space 
A design competition for plans of how to improve the street's design to reflect its cultural importance was held in 2003 by the Royal Borough of Kensington and Chelsea. The competition was won by the architectural firm Dixon Jones for a shared space scheme for the road and surrounding streets which would give pedestrians greater priority whilst still allow some vehicular traffic at a reduced speed.
 The project also aimed to improve the artistic and architectural merit of the streetscape. The scheme was completed ahead of the 2012 London Olympics.

Gallery

See also 
 Cromwell Gardens
 Cromwell Road
 Museum Lane
 Thurloe Square
 Prince Consort Road

References

External links 

 Albertopolis: South Kensington from above History, architecture and future plans, from the Royal Institute of British Architects
 A Vision for Exhibition Road: A Space for the New Century and Exhibition Road Trail from the Victoria and Albert Museum
 Exhibition Road is reborn from the Evening Standard, dated 27 March 2008
 Discover South Kensington activities and cultural events
 Road users mingle in naked scheme from the BBC, dated 6 January 2005

Museum districts in the United Kingdom
South Kensington
Streets in the Royal Borough of Kensington and Chelsea
Great Exhibition